Alyssa Sutherland (born 23 September 1982) is an Australian actress and model best known for her role as Queen Aslaug in the History Channel television series Vikings (2013–2016).

Early life
Sutherland was born in Brisbane. Sutherland attended Craigslea State High School on the northside of Brisbane.

Career

Modeling
Sutherland's modeling career began when she won the 1997 annual Bonne Belle model search of Girlfriend, a teen magazine in Australia. Following her win, she signed a contract with Vogue Australia.

Sutherland has had an extensive runway, print and television modeling career, appearing in campaigns for Bulgari, Ralph Lauren, Garnier, Calvin Klein, Chanel, John Frieda, Kerastase, Hugo Boss and Abercrombie & Fitch.

Sutherland has appeared on the cover of magazines for Vogue Australia, Harper's Bazaar Singapore and Japan, Elle Germany, Australian Style, Glamour Italy and Black and White. Sutherland has also shot extensive editorial for Vogue (Germany, Australia, Italy, Greece and U.S.), Elle (Australia and U.S.), Marie-Claire (UK), Harper's Bazaar (Australia), Glamour Italy, I.D., Wallpaper* and The Face and Scene. Sutherland has worked with renowned fashion photographers, including Herb Ritts, Bruce Weber, Ellen von Unwerth and Steven Meisel.

In 2007, Sutherland became the newest Flake Girl when Cadbury revived its iconic TV advertisements after a five-year hiatus. The advertisement shows her, in reverse time, eating a Flake bar in a convertible during a rain shower. She is one of several former Cadbury advert actors to speak out in favour of the "Keep Cadbury British" campaign in opposition to the sale of Cadbury to a non-British owner.

Since transitioning away from modeling, Sutherland has expressed guilt about having contributed to the "unrealistic standards" of beauty set by the fashion industry and has been critical of its "strict" and damaging size requirements.

Acting
Sutherland's acting career includes roles in the films The Devil Wears Prada, Day on Fire, Don't Look Up, and Arbitrage. In May 2021, Sutherland was cast in the film Evil Dead Rise.

She also starred in the television series New Amsterdam, Vikings, The Mist, Timeless and New Gold Mountain.

Personal life

In 2012, she married her boyfriend Laurence Shanet. The couple divorced shortly thereafter in 2013.

Filmography

References

External links
 Alyssa Sutherland Biography
 
 
 Cadbury Flake "Summer Rain" (2007)

1982 births
Living people
21st-century Australian actresses
Actresses from Brisbane
Australian female models